Buma can mean:
 a Dutch surname:
 Anita Buma (1958), a Dutch Antarctic researcher
 Bernhard van Haersma Buma (1932-2020), Dutch politician and mayor.
 Jaap-Derk Buma (1972), a Dutch field hockey player
 Sybrand van Haersma Buma (1965), a CDA politician and member of parliament since 2002
 Wybren Jan Buma (1910-1999), a Dutch scholar of Frisian languages and history
 A pumping station of the Noordoostpolder in the Netherlands, named after a politician involved in the planning of the Zuiderzee works
 Kufra Airport in Libya, which was referred to as "Buma" during World War II
 Buma/Stemra, a Dutch copyright organization that oversees distribution of royalties among publishers, musicians, and writers
 Buma, another name for the language better called Teanu (Solomon Islands)